Sangabad (also Romanized as Sangābād) is a village in Arzuiyeh Rural District, in the Central District of Arzuiyeh County, Kerman Province, Iran. At the 2006 census, its population was 40, in 8 families.

References 

Populated places in Arzuiyeh County